John Keeble may refer to:
 John Keeble (composer) (1711–1786), English organist and composer
 John Keeble (writer) (born 1944), Canadian-American author
 John Bell Keeble (1868–1929), American attorney and academic administrator
 John Keeble (born 1959) is an English pop and rock drummer.

See also
 John Keble (1792–1866), English churchman, poet, and one of the leaders of the Oxford Movement